Admiral Sir Henry William Bruce  (2 February 1792 – 14 December 1863) was a Royal Navy officer who went on to be Commander-in-Chief, Portsmouth.

Military career
Born the son of Sir Henry Hervey Aston Bruce, 1st Baronet, Bruce joined the Royal Navy in 1803. He took part in the Battle of Trafalgar in 1805. He also took part in the War of 1812. He became Captain of HMS Britannia in 1823, of HMS Imogene in 1836, of HMS Agincourt in 1842 and of HMS Queen in 1847.

In 1851 he was appointed Commodore of the West Africa Squadron. He negotiated and signed the Treaty Between Great Britain and Lagos of 1 January 1852. Then in 1854, as Commander-in-Chief, Pacific Station, he founded a military hospital at Esquimalt. He was appointed Commander-in-Chief, Portsmouth in 1860.

He lived at Ballyscullion in Northern Ireland. He died in Liverpool while still serving as a naval officer and was interred in the family vault at Downhill in Northern Ireland.

He is memorialised on the family gravestone in the south-east corner of North Berwick parish churchyard.

Family
In 1822 he married Jane Cochrane. In 1832, following the death of his first wife, he married Louisa Mary Minchin Dalrymple.

Legacy

"This piece of silver plate was presented to Sir Henry William Bruce by his Captains, Commanders, and Lieutenants in 1854 as a token of their grateful sense of his uniform, kindness and consideration to themselves, the officers and ship's companies under their command, during the period they had the pleasure of serving under him on the West Coast of Africa".

References

See also
 

|-

1792 births
1863 deaths
Knights Commander of the Order of the Bath
Royal Navy admirals
Royal Navy personnel of the War of 1812
British expatriates in Nigeria
Officers of the West Africa Squadron
Younger sons of baronets
Royal Navy personnel of the Napoleonic Wars